The Grytdalen Hydroelectric Power Station is a hydroelectric power station in Valsøyfjord in the municipality of Heim in Trøndelag county, Norway. It is a run-of-river plant that utilizes a  drop from the lake Englivatnet to the intake dam of the Valsøyfjord Hydroelectric Power Station. The plant came into operation in March 2012 and is owned by Svorka Energi.

References

Hydroelectric power stations in Norway
Heim, Norway
Energy infrastructure completed in 2012